Elliot Forhan (born 1980) is an attorney and non-profit executive who currently serves in the Ohio House of Representatives representing the 21st district in Cuyahoga County.

Early life and education 
After graduating from high school, Forhan earned an undergraduate degree from Kenyon College in Gambier, Ohio. He then earned attended Yale Law School, where he earned a JD.

Career 
Until leaving to work for the Joe Biden 2020 presidential campaign, Forhan worked as an attorney in the Cleveland office of BakerHostetler. He had previously worked for Governor Ted Strickland and State Treasurer Richard Cordray. In addition to his current law practice, which he operates as a solo practitioner, Forhan serves as general counsel for a non-profit organization focused on patent law.

Ohio House of Representatives

Election
Forhan was elected in the general election on November 8, 2022, winning 73.4 percent of the vote over 26.6 percent of Republican candidate Kelly Powell

Personal life
Forhan is the son of two women whose wedding he officiated after the Obergefell v. Hodges Supreme Court decision legalizing same-sex marriage.

Election results

References

Democratic Party members of the Ohio House of Representatives
Living people
21st-century American politicians
1980 births
George Washington University alumni
Case Western Reserve University alumni
African-American state legislators in Ohio